|}

The Grand Prix de Deauville is a Group 2 flat horse race in France open to thoroughbreds aged three years or older. It is run at Deauville over a distance of 2,500 metres (about 1 mile and 4½ furlongs), and it is scheduled to take place each year in August.

History
The event was established in 1866, and it was originally called the Coupe de Deauville. It was initially contested over 2,400 metres.

The race was renamed the Grand Prix de Deauville in 1871. It was opened to foreign horses in 1872, and was subsequently won by international contenders such as Kincsem and Tristan. Its distance was increased to 2,500 metres in 1886, and to 2,600 metres in 1903.

The event was known as the Grand Prix de Trouville-Deauville from 1908 to 1911. It was abandoned throughout World War I, with no running from 1914 to 1918.

The Grand Prix de Deauville was cancelled once during World War II, in 1940. For the remainder of this period, while its regular venue was closed, it was switched between Longchamp (1941–42, 1945), Maisons-Laffitte (1943) and Le Tremblay (1944). The Longchamp and Maisons-Laffitte editions were contested over 2,500 metres.

The race's distance was extended to 2,700 metres in 1973. Its present length, 2,500 metres, was introduced in 1990.

Records
Most successful horse (3 wins):
 Tristan – 1882, 1883, 1884

Leading jockey (5 wins):
 Yves Saint-Martin – Bounteous (1962), Val de Loir (1963), Ashmore (1976), Perrault (1981), Baby Turk (1986)
 Dominique Boeuf – Borromini (1989), Robertet (1990), Policy Maker (2003), Irish Wells (2006, 2007)

Leading trainer (10 wins):
 André Fabre – Zalataia (1983), Borromini (1989), Modhish (1992), Swain (1995), Epistolaire (1998), Polish Summer (2002), Cherry Mix (2004), Getaway (2008), Masterstroke (2012), Botanik (2022)

Leading owner (5 wins):
 Frédéric de Lagrange – Montgoubert (1867), Trocadero (1868), Mortemer (1869), Nougat (1876), Castillon (1881)
 Daniel Wildenstein – Schönbrunn (1970), Ashmore (1974, 1976), Air de Cour (1985), Robertet (1990)

Winners since 1978

 Polish Summer finished first in 2003, but he was relegated to second place following a stewards' inquiry.

Earlier winners

 1866: Affidavit
 1867: Montgoubert
 1868: Trocadero
 1869: Mortemer
 1870: Dutch Skater
 1871: La Perichole
 1872: Bivouac
 1873: Sir John
 1874: Perla
 1875: Saint Cyr
 1876: Nougat
 1877: Vinaigrette
 1878: Kincsem
 1879: El Rey
 1880: Le Destrier
 1881: Castillon
 1882: Tristan
 1883: Tristan
 1884: Tristan
 1885: Althorp
 1886: Polyeucte
 1887: Pythagoras
 1888: Galaor
 1889: Le Sancy
 1890: Le Sancy
 1891: Yellow
 1892: Naviculaire
 1893: Galette
 1894: Algarade
 1895: Merlin
 1896: Riposte
 1897: Van Diemen
 1898: Le Samaritain
 1899: Fourire
 1900: Monsieur Amedee
 1901: Jacobite
 1902: Maximum
 1903: Shebdiz
 1904: Turenne
 1905: Ecots
 1906: Maintenon
 1907: Punta Gorda
 1908: Cheikh
 1909: Biniou
 1910: Joie
 1911: Basse Pointe
 1912: Gorgorito
 1913: Isard
 1914–18: no race
 1919: Verdier
 1920: Tullamore
 1921: Zagreus
 1922: Bahadur
 1923: São Paulo
 1924: Swansea
 1925: Dark Diamond
 1926: Asteroide
 1927: Le Polisson
 1928: La Futelaye
 1929: Charlemagne
 1930: Rieur
 1931: Celerina
 1932: Confidence
 1933: Queen of Scots
 1934: Morvillars
 1935: Ping Pong
 1936: Fantastic
 1937: Saint Preux
 1938: Terre Rose
 1939: Birikil
 1940: no race
 1941: Jock
 1942: Adaris
 1943: Cordon Rouge
 1944: Verso II
 1945: Basileus
 1946: Kerlor
 1947: Le Paillon
 1948: Turmoil
 1949:
 1950: Alizier
 1951: Coast Guard
 1952: Damaka
 1953: Flute Enchantee
 1954: Doux Vert
 1955: Rosa Bonheur
 1956: Tall Chief
 1957: Scot
 1958: Chippendale
 1959: Fils de Roi
 1960: Wordpam
 1961: Molvedo
 1962: Bounteous
 1963: Val de Loir
 1964: Sailor
 1965: Sailor
 1966: Lionel
 1967: Lionel
 1968: Soyeux
 1969: Djakao
 1970: Schönbrunn
 1971: Miss Dan
 1972: Novius
 1973: Card King
 1974: Ashmore
 1975: L'Ensorceleur *
 1976: Ashmore
 1977: Dom Alaric

* Duke of Marmalade finished first in 1975, but he was relegated to fifth place following a stewards' inquiry.

See also
 List of French flat horse races
 Recurring sporting events established in 1866 – this race is included under its original title, Coupe de Deauville.

References

 France Galop / Racing Post:
 galop.courses-france.com:
 1866–1889, 1890–1919, 1920–1949, 1950–1979, 1980–present

 france-galop.com – A Brief History: Grand Prix de Deauville.
 galopp-sieger.de – Grand Prix de Deauville.
 horseracingintfed.com – International Federation of Horseracing Authorities – Grand Prix de Deauville (2018).
 pedigreequery.com – Grand Prix de Deauville – Deauville.

Open middle distance horse races
Deauville-La Touques Racecourse
Horse races in France